Vipera aspis is a viper species found in southwestern Europe. 
Its common names include asp, asp viper, European asp, and aspic viper, among others. Like all other vipers, it is venomous. Bites from this species can be more severe than from the European adder, V. berus; not only can they be very painful, but approximately 4% of all untreated bites are fatal. The specific epithet, aspis, is a Greek word that means "viper." Five subspecies are currently recognized, including the nominate subspecies described here.

Description
Males, however, are a little slimmer than females. The tail is very short: one-seventh to one-ninth of total body length in females, and one-sixth to one-eighth in males.

The head is broad, triangular and quite distinct from the neck. The tip of the snout is slightly but distinctly upturned. The rostral scale is generally higher than it is wide, touching 2 to 3 scales on the upper side of the snout. Dorsally, the snout is flat with distinct and slightly raised sharp margins. The nasal scale is single (hardly ever divided) and separated from the rostral by a single nasorostral scale. The crown is covered with numerous small and irregular scales of different sizes that are mostly smooth, but sometimes slightly keeled. Frontal and parietal scales are usually not present, but if so, they are small and irregularly shaped, with the frontal separated from the supraoculars by 2 scale rows. The supraocular scales are large and distinct, separated by 4–7 scale rows. There are 10–12 (rarely 8–18) small circumorbital scales below the supraocular. The eye is separated from the supralabials by 2 (rarely 3) scale rows. The vertical diameter of the eye is about the same as the distance between the eye and the mouth. There are 9–13 supralabials. The 4th–5th supralabials (rarely 4th–6th or 5th–6th) are separated from the eye by 2 (rarely 3) rows of small scales, but sometimes there is a single scale between the 4th supralabial and the eye. Generally, the temporal scales are smooth, but sometimes slightly keeled.

Midbody, there are 21–23 (rarely 19 or 25) rows of dorsal scales. These are strongly keeled, except for the outermost rows that vary and are sometimes smooth. There are 134–170 ventral scales. Subspecies V. a. aspis averages fewer than 150 ventrals, while V. a. atra averages more. The anal scale is single. Males have 32–49 subcaudals, females 30–43. The subcaudal scales are paired.

The dorsal markings vary strongly, but only rarely take the form of a clear zigzag, as in V. berus.

Common names and historical usage
Common names of Vipera aspis include "asp", "asp viper", "European asp", "aspic viper", "European viper" and "Jura viper". In the past, the term "asp" has been used to refer to any venomous snake.

The snake which supposedly killed the Egyptian Queen Cleopatra is named by Velleius Paterculus as an asp, and by Martial as a viper. Virgil mentions two snakes but does not name their species, while Plutarch mentions twin prick marks on her arm but does not state that these were toothmarks, so they could also have been from a poisoned hair pin. There is a tradition that the bite was a cobra's, but experts consider that a cobra would have been too big (at over 5 feet long) to smuggle in a basket.

Geographic range
 
It is native to France, Andorra, northeastern Spain, extreme southwestern Germany in the southern Black Forest, Switzerland, Italy, and northwestern Slovenia. The original type locality was listed simply as "Gallia." However, Schwarz (1936) proposed that it be restricted to "Poitou [Frankreich]" (Poitou, France). It has been extirpated from Bulgaria.

In August–October 2006, a number of specimens were discovered in a wooded area near the town of Poortugaal in the Netherlands. Although they were doing quite well, the species is not native to this country. It is likely that one or more escaped or were set loose in the area.

Conservation status
This species is classified as Least Concern according to the IUCN Red List of Threatened Species (v3.1, 2001). So listed due to its wide distribution, tolerance of a broad range of habitats, presumed large population, and because it is unlikely to be declining fast enough to qualify for listing in a more threatened category.

However, subspecies V. a. aspis is categorized as Critically Endangered in Switzerland, V. a. atra is categorized as Vulnerable, and V. a. francisciredi is categorized as Endangered.

In general, the species is also listed as protected (Appendix III) under the Berne Convention.

Habitat

This species has a few clearly defined and relatively specific habitat requirements. It needs warm areas that are exposed to the sun, structured vegetation and comparatively dry soils. In Italy and France, it is often found in areas with low mountains or hills, notably in limestone regions, but sometimes occurs in lower plains. It has a preference for vegetated areas or environments with at least some cover. Here it can be found on sunny slopes, on scrublands, in glades, in mountain meadows, forest clearings, at the borders of woods, in rubbish dumps and in stone quarries. In Italy, it occurs in mesic chestnut/oak woodlands and often near streams.

Venom
A bite from this species can be more severe than from V. berus and is very painful. According to Stemmler (1971), about 4% of all untreated bites are fatal. Lombardi and Bianco (1974) mention that this species is responsible for 90% of all cases of snakebite in Italy and it is the only mortal snake in Italian mountains.

The toxicity of the venom varies. Stemmler (1971) states that the population in Passwang district, Switzerland have the strongest venom based on studies conducted on mice. Compared to venoms from other species, it is relatively toxic. Brown (1973) gives  values of 1.0 mg/kg IV and 1.0–2.0 mg/kg SC. Tu et al. (1969) report 4.7 mg/kg IM. Venom yield is relatively low. Boquet (1964) reported a daily extraction figure of 9–10 mg.

Envenomation symptoms include rapidly spreading acute pain, followed by edema and discoloration. Severe haemorrhagic necrosis may occur within a few hours. Vision may be severely impaired, most likely due to degradation of blood and blood vessels in the eyes. The venom has both coagulant and anticoagulant effects. The venom may also affect glomerular structure, which can lead to death due to renal failure.

According to Cheymol et al. (1973), the venom does not affect neuromuscular contractions in in vitro preparations.<ref>{{Cite journal |vauthors=Cheymol J, Boquet P, Detrait J, Roch-Arveller M |year=1973 |title=Comparaison des principales propriétés pharmacologiques de différents venins dEchis carinatus (Vipéridés) |trans-title=Comparison of the principal pharmacologic properties of different venoms of Echis carinatus (Viperidae) |journal=Archives Internationales de Pharmacodynamie et de Thérapie |volume=205 |issue=2 |pages=293–304|pmid=4766551 }}</ref> Lack of this neurotoxic affect would indicate that fatal cases involving the cardiovascular system are the result of direct muscle injury or reduced oxygen exchange. On the other hand, Gonzalez (1991) reported that in two cases the victims developed neurotoxic symptoms, including difficulty in breathing and swallowing, as well as paralysis of the bitten limbs.

Subspecies

Gallery
A Vipera aspis eating a lizard, Tuscany, Italy.

References

Further reading

 Arnold EN, Burton JA. 1978. A Field Guide to the Reptiles and Amphibians of Britain and Europe. London: Collins. 272 pp. . (Vipera aspis, pp. 218–219 + Plates 39-40 + Map 123.)
Boulenger GA. 1913. The Snakes of Europe. London: Methuen & Co. Ltd. xi + 269 pp. + Plates I.- XIV. (Vipera aspis, pp. 239–246, Figure 36, Plate XIII.)
 
Phisalix M. 1968. La livrée des vipères de France (d'apres des notes manuscrites inédites). Bull Mus. Nat. Hist., Paris 40: 661–676.
Zuffi, Marco A.L. 2002. A critique of the systematic position of the asp viper subspecies Vipera aspis aspis (Linnaeus, 1758), Vipera aspis atra Meisner, 1820, Vipera aspis francisciredi Laurent, 1768, Vipera aspis hugyi Schinz, 1833 and Vipera aspis zinnikeri Kramer, 1958. Amphibia-Reptilia'' 23''' (2): 191–213.

External links

European Field Herping Community
 
 Vipera aspis at Amphibians and Reptiles of Europe. Accessed 9 October 2006.
 Asp viper, Vipera aspis at Reptiles & Amphibians of France. Accessed 6 June 2008.

aspis
Reptiles of Europe
Reptiles described in 1758
Taxa named by Carl Linnaeus